Echinocardium flavescens, sometimes called the yellow sea potato, is a species of sea urchin in the family Loveniidae, chiefly found in the northeast Atlantic region.

Description
It is yellow to the tube feet (hence the name flavescens, "yellowish") and has spines on the underside of the body. The frontal ambulacrum is not indented and there are larger spines in the interambulacral areas of the upper side of the test. Its labrum is long, reaching the second pair of ambulacral plates.

Distribution
Found in the waters off Great Britain, Ireland and associated islands.

Biology
Matures in early summer.

Ecology

References

Spatangoida
Fauna of the Atlantic Ocean
Fauna of the Isle of Man
Fauna of the British Isles
Animals described in 1776
Taxa named by Otto Friedrich Müller